The 2007 J.League Division 1 season was the 15th season since the establishment of the J.League. The season began on March 3 and ended on December 1.

General

Promotion and relegation
 At the end of the 2006 season, Yokohama FC, Kashiwa Reysol, and Vissel Kobe were promoted to J1
 At the end of the 2006 season,  Avispa Fukuoka, Cerezo Osaka, and Kyoto Purple Sanga were relegated to J2.

Changes in competition formats
 In the past, J.League Champion qualified to A3 Champions Cup, but since 2007 this berth is given to the Nabisco Cup winner.

Honours

Clubs

Following eighteen clubs participated in J.League Division 1 during 2007 season. Of these clubs, Yokohama FC, Kashiwa Reysol, and Vissel Kobe were newly promoted clubs.

 Kashima Antlers
 Urawa Red Diamonds
 Omiya Ardija
 JEF United Chiba
 Kashiwa Reysol 
 FC Tokyo
 Kawasaki Frontale
 Yokohama F. Marinos
 Yokohama FC 
 Ventforet Kofu
 Albirex Nigata
 Shimizu S-Pulse
 Jublio Iwata
 Nagayo Grampus Eight
 Gamba Osaka
 Vissel Kobe 
 Sanfrecce Hiroshima
 Oita Trinita

Format
Eighteen clubs will play in double round-robin (home and away) format, a total of 34 games each. A club receives 3 points for a win, 1 point for a tie, and 0 points for a loss. The clubs are ranked by points, and tie breakers are, in the following order: 
 Goal differential 
 Goals scored 
 Head-to-head results
A draw would be conducted, if necessary.  However, if two clubs are tied at the first place, both clubs will be declared as the champions. The bottom two clubs will be relegated to J2, while the 16th placed club plays a two-legged Promotion/relegation Series.
Changes from Previous Year
none

Table

Results

Top scorers

Attendance

Awards

Individual

Best Eleven

* The number in brackets denotes the number of times that the footballer has appeared in the Best 11.

References

External links
 J. League Official Stats

J1 League seasons
1
Japan
Japan